Markus Keller (born 19 August 1989) is a German professional ice hockey goaltender. He currently plays for Augsburger Panther of the Deutsche Eishockey Liga (DEL). He has previously played for Eisbären Berlin in DEL.

Playing career
After parts of five seasons in the DEL with Berlin and Augsburg, Keller signed a one-year contract to join EC Kassel Huskies of the DEL2 on April 2, 2015.

On April 13, 2018, Keller returned to the DEL with Augsburg after a three-season stint with the Huskies, signing a one-year deal.

References

External links

1989 births
Living people
Augsburger Panther players
Eisbären Berlin players
German ice hockey goaltenders
Kassel Huskies players
Sportspeople from Augsburg
SC Riessersee players